"P'tit Quinquin" is a song by Alexandre Desrousseaux which was written in the Picard language (also known as chti or chtimi) in 1853.  Picard is closely related to French, and is spoken in two regions in the north of France – Nord-Pas-de-Calais, Picardy and in parts of the Belgian region of Wallonia.

This simple lullaby (P'tit quinquin means "little child") demonstrates the revival of Picard in the area, to the extent that it became the marching song of the northern soldiers leaving for the Franco-Prussian War of 1870.  Today it could be called the unofficial anthem of the French city of Lille, and more generally of the Nord-Pas-de-Calais region of France.

Extended Picard lyrics (after first stanza):
  Ainsi l'aut' jour eun' pauv' dintellière,
  In amiclotant sin p'tit garchon
  Qui, d'puis tros quarts d'heure, n'faijot que d'braire,
  Tachot d'l'indormir par eun' canchon.
  Ell' li dijot : « min Narcisse,
  D'main t'aras du pain d'épice,
  Du chuc à gogo,
  Si t'es sache et qu'te fais dodo. »

- R'frain -

  Et si te m'laiche faire eun' bonn' semaine,
  J'irai dégager tin biau sarrau,
  Tin patalon d'drap, tin giliet d'laine...
  Comme un p'tit milord te s'ras farau !
  J't'acaterai, l'jour de l'ducasse,
  Un porichinell' cocasse,
  Un turlututu,
  Pour juer l'air du Capiau-Pointu.

- R'frain -

  Nous irons dins l'cour Jeannette-à-Vaques,
  Vir les marionnett's. Comm' te riras,
  Quand t'intindras dire : « Un doup' pou Jacques ! »
  Pa' l'porichinell' qui parl' magas !...
  Te li mettras dins s'menotte,
  Au lieu d'doupe, un rond d'carotte !
  I t'dira : « Merci ! »
  Pins' comm' nous arons du plaisi !

- R'frain -

  Et si par hasard sin maîte s'fâche,
  Ch'est alors Narciss' que nous rirons !
  Sans n'n avoir invi', j'prindrai m'n air mache,
  J'li dirai sin nom et ses sournoms,
  J'li dirai des fariboles,
  I m'in répondra des drôles,
  Infin, un chacun
  Verra deux pestac' au lieu d'un...

- R'frain -

  Allons serr' tes yeux, dors min bonhomme,
  J'vas dire eun' prière à P'tit-Hésus,
  Pour qu'i vienne ichi pindant tin somme,
  T'fai' rêver qu'j'ai les mains plein's d'écus,
  Pour qu'i t'apporte eun' coquille,
  Avec su chirop qui guile
  Tout l'long d'tin minton...
  Te pourléqu'ras tros heur's de long !

- R'frain -

  L'mos qui vient, d'Saint-Nicolas ch'est l'fiête,
  Pour sûr, au soir, i viendra t'trouver.
  I t'f'ra un sermon, et t'l'aich'ra mette
  In d'zous du balot, un grand painnier.
  I l'rimplira, si t'es sache,
  D'séquois qui t'rindront bénache,
  Sans cha, sin baudet
  T'invoira un grand martinet.

- R'frain -

  Ni les marionnettes, ni l'pain n'épice
  N'ont produit d'effet. Mais l'martinet
  A vit' rappajé l'petit Narcisse,
  Qui craingnot d'vir arriver l'baudet.
  Il a dit s'canchon-dormoire.
  S'mèr' l'a mis dins s'n ochennoire,
  A r'pris sin coussin,
  Et répété vingt fos che r'frain :

  Dors min p'tit Quinquin,
  Min p'tit pouchin,
  Min gros rojin ;
  Te m'f'ras du chagrin,
  Si te n'dors point j'qu'à d'main.

See also
Folk music

External links
Le P'tit quinquin - Full lyrics in Picard (left), and a translation into French (right); also has a sound file of the chorus being sung in Picard (.wav and .ra formats)

Lullabies
Traditional children's songs
Songs about children
1853 songs
Picard language